Food is a 1992 Czech animated short film directed by Jan Švankmajer that uses claymation and pixilation. It examines the human relationship with food by showing breakfast, lunch, and dinner.

Plot

Breakfast
A man (Bedrich Glaser) enters a room, sits down, and brushes the previous diner's leftovers onto the floor. Across from him sits another man with a placard attached to a chain hanging around his neck. The diner stands up and reads the placard one line at a time and follows the instructions. He puts money down the man's throat and pokes him in the eye. The man's shirt unbuttons itself, and a dumbwaiter rises up into where the man's chest should be. The diner takes his food, and punches the man in the chin with his third knuckle for his utensils. When he is done eating, he kicks the man's shin for a napkin. After wiping off his mouth, the diner convulses, and then goes limp. The man now comes to life, stretches, and places the placard on the former diner. He stands and puts another tally mark on the wall. Another diner comes in and the scenario is repeated with him. At the end, we see a line stretching down the hall and around the corner.

Lunch
Two diners, a business man and a vagabond, are unable to get the waiter's attention. They proceed to eat everything in sight: the flowers, their shoes, pants, shirt, underwear, plates, tablecloth, table, and chairs, now leaving both nude behind, The vagabond watches the business man and then eats what he eats. All the while they are eating whatever is on or around them, they try to get the waiter's attention whenever he passes by, but to no avail. In the end with everything else eaten, the business man eats his utensils. The vagabond also eats his. The business man then smiles, pulls his utensils from his mouth, and advances on the vagabond, who recoils in horror.

Dinner
In a luxurious restaurant, a wealthy gourmet sits at a table adding many sauces and spices to his dish, which is hidden by the sheer number of condiments. This continues for a long time, and then he hammers a fork to his wooden left hand. The dish is then revealed to be his missing hand, which he proceeds to cut into. In a series of short and violent scenes, we are then shown an athlete eating his lower leg, a woman eating her breasts, and the last eater, who is about to eat his genitals. As he realises the presence of the camera, the man covers his genitals and shoos the camera away with his hand.

Reception
A New York Times review called the film "caustically witty but slight." It goes on to say that "Švankmajer conceived the film in the 1970s, when it seemed too risky a political allegory to be made [...] it now seems too simple a statement about how people are devoured by mechanistic states and each other."

Michael Nottingham pointed out that "the humour is particularly black in [the last] segment, mocking how delicate social ritual and conditioning are effective masks for brutal self-destruction."

Cast
Ludvík Šváb as Eater #1
Bedřich Glaser as Eater #2
Jan Kraus as Eater #3
Pavel Marek as Eater
Josef Fiala as Eater #4
Karel Hamr as Eater #5

References

External links
 
 

1992 films
Czechoslovak animated films
Films directed by Jan Švankmajer
Films with live action and animation
Czechoslovak animated short films
Czech animated films
Surrealist films
1990s stop-motion animated films
Pixilation films
1992 animated films
Czech animated comedy films